Catwalk Confidential is a play by Robyn Peterson, based on her life as a Catwalk model. It played the Edinburgh Fringe Festival before transferring to the West End for a limited four week run in September 2009. It starred Peterson as herself.

External links
Official Website
Telegraph Article
Telegraph Review

West End plays
2009 plays